The Whole Town Accuses (French: Toute la ville accuse) is a 1956 French comedy drama film directed by Claude Boissol and starring Jean Marais, Etchika Choureau and Noël Roquevert.  The film was known under the working title Mille et un millions in France. It was shot at the Neuilly Studios in Paris. The film's sets were designed by the art director Robert Dumesnil.

Cast 
 Jean Marais as  François Nérac
 Etchika Choureau as Catherine Aravitte
 Noël Roquevert as Duplantin
 François Patrice as Patrice Lourel 
 Michel Etcheverry as leader of the bandits
 Georges Lannes as the mayor
 Albert Duvaleix as  M. Arvette - the notary
 Claude Le Lorrain as  young man
 Charles Bouillaud as  Pistard
 Henri Cogan as  a gangster
 Odette Barencey as  Mary, the good
 Marcel Pérès as  the man on the sidewalk
 Raphaël Patorni as  president of the Tribunal

References

Bibliography
 Andrew, Dudley & Gillain, Anne . A Companion to François Truffaut. John Wiley & Sons, 2013.

External links 
 
 Toute la ville accuse (1956) at the Films de France

1956 films
French comedy-drama films
1950s French-language films
French black-and-white films
Films directed by Claude Boissol
1956 comedy-drama films
1956 comedy films
1956 drama films
1950s French films
Pathé films